Jeff Eckard (born 18 December 1965) is a Canadian sailor. He competed in the men's 470 event at the 1992 Summer Olympics.

References

External links
 

1965 births
Living people
Canadian male sailors (sport)
Olympic sailors of Canada
Sailors at the 1992 Summer Olympics – 470
Sportspeople from Pietermaritzburg